Cenotaph Road is a famous road in Teynampet in Chennai.

This road connects Mount Road to Turn Bulls Signal. The road has an important branch of ICICI Bank. TPL House (which houses Tamil Nadu Petroproducts Limited), Sasken Communication Technologies, Ernst & Young, etc.), the Russian Trade Embassy, and a Cafe Coffee Day outlet are other important landmarks on this road. The corporate office of Arihant Foundations, a leading real estate company based in Chennai, is also located on Cenotaph Road.

Cenotaph road has a first and second street, first and second lanes, and another road named Chitharanajan road adjoining it. Kollywood actress Trisha Krishnan resides on 2nd lane while UB Group chairman Vijay Mallya has a house on 2nd lane. The chief minister of Tamil Nadu M. K. Stalin, lives on Chitharanjan road. In the first lane, Dr. K. P. Shamsuddeen,a leading cardiologist has a house. Sudha Ragunathan also resides at Cenetoph Road.

References

Roads in Chennai